Canoe Lake 165A is an Indian reserve of the Canoe Lake Cree First Nation in Saskatchewan. It is 30 miles southwest of Île-à-la-Crosse.

References

Indian reserves in Saskatchewan
Division No. 18, Saskatchewan